Yakutinskaya is a rural locality (a village) in Nizhneslobodskoye Rural Settlement, Vozhegodsky District, Vologda Oblast, Russia. The population was 31 as of 2002.

Geography 
Yakutinskaya is located 41 km east of Vozhega (the district's administrative centre) by road. Zarechnaya is the nearest rural locality.

References 

Rural localities in Vozhegodsky District